Érasme-Louis, Baron Surlet de Chokier (27 November 1769 – 7 August 1839), born in Liège, was a Belgian politician and, before the accession of Leopold I to the Belgian throne, was the first regent of Belgium.

During the Liège Revolution of 1789, when a crowd followed the example of the French Revolution and drove off Prince-Bishop of Liège César-Constantin-François, Surlet de Chokier served in the patriotic army. When the following year this army was defeated by the Austrians at Hasselt and Zutendaal, Surlet de Chokier was forced to flee to Breda, not being able to return to his estate at Gingelom until 1792.

After the French annexation of Liège, Surlet de Chokier became a devoted follower of the French revolution and of Napoleon. In 1800, Surlet de Chokier was elected mayor of Gingelom and member of the départemental council of Meuse-Inférieure. In 1812, he became a member of the French parliament.

After the fall of Napoleon, Surlet de Chokier entered the House of Representatives of the Staten-Generaal as leader of the Southern opposition, where his opposition to the government gave him the nickname Surlet de Choquant. Although he was made a baron by the king in 1816, his opposition had angered King William I so much that the monarch personally made sure that Surlet de Chokier was not re-elected in 1828.

After the Belgian Revolution started, Surlet de Chokier was sent by the Arrondissement of Hasselt as a deputy to the National Congress. Elected Chairman of the Congress, Surlet de Chokier was active in the creation of the Belgian Constitution. After the Duke of Nemours refused the Belgian crown that had been offered to him, Surlet de Chokier was appointed Regent of Belgium on 24 February 1831. He served as Regent until Leopold I took the oath as King of the Belgians on 21 July 1831.

Surlet de Chokier died in 1839 in Gingelom.

Heraldry

External links
 Erasme, Louis Surlet De Chokier (1769 - 1839)  (French National Assembly)

1769 births
1839 deaths
Barons of Belgium
Barons of the Netherlands
Members of the National Congress of Belgium
People from Limburg (Belgium)
People of the Belgian Revolution
Regents of Belgium
Politicians from Liège
19th-century Belgian politicians
People of the Liège Revolution